Parham is a surname of Anglo-Saxon English origin.

Origin and variants 
Parham is a habitational name derived from villages in Suffolk in East Anglia in the East of England, and Sussex in South East England. It is etymologically derived from the pre-7th century Old English words "peru" or "pere" meaning "pear," and "ham" meaning "hamlet" or "region." As a surname, it is also descriptive, being used to describe someone who lived or worked in or near a pear orchard, or generally someone from a pear-producing region.

A very old surname, Parham was first recorded in 1086 in Parham, a village in Suffolk, under an individual named Turmod de Perham in the "little" Domesday Book for Norfolk, Suffolk, and Essex during the reign of King William I (1066 - 1087). The village itself was listed as "Perreham" in the publication.

Until the gradual standardization of English spelling in the last few centuries, English lacked any comprehensive system of spelling. Consequently, spelling variations in names are frequently found in early Anglo-Saxon and later Anglo-Norman documents, meaning that one’s name was often spelled several different ways over the course of one’s life. As such, different variations of the Parham surname usually have the same origin.

People 

Arthur Parham (1883–1961), English bishop
Charles Fox Parham (1873–1929), American preacher instrumental in the formation of Pentecostalism
Donald Parham (born 1997), American football player
Dylan Parham (born 1999), American football player
Easy Parham (1921–1982), American professional basketball player
Sir Frederick Parham (1901–1991), Royal Navy admiral
Lennon Parham (born 1976), American actress
Lucy Parham (born 1966), British concert pianist
Nora Parham (1927–1963), Belizean woman executed for murder.
Philip Parham (born 1960), British ambassador
Robert Parham (born 1966), American kickboxer
Tiny Parham (1900–1943), Canadian-born American jazz bandleader and pianist
Truck Parham (1911–2002), American jazz double-bassist

References 

English-language surnames